Phú Hữu may refer to the following places in Vietnam:

Phú Hữu, An Giang, a commune of An Phú District
Phú Hữu, District 9, a ward of District 9, Ho Chi Minh City
Phú Hữu, Hậu Giang, a commune of Châu Thành District, Hậu Giang Province